Christian Seifert (born 8 May 1969, in Rastatt) is a German entrepreneur and business manager who served as a CEO of the Deutsche Fußball Liga (DFL) from 2019 to 2021. He was a member of the League Board and Vice President of the German Football Association (German: Deuscher Fuball-Bund, DFB). He was also Vice Chairman of the Board of the Bundesliga-Stiftung (Bundesliga Foundation) and spokesperson for the Initiative Profisport Deutschland (IPD).

Life
Seifert graduated from the technical high school in Rastatt in 1988. At the University of Duisburg-Essen, he studied Communication studies, Marketing and Sociology from 1991 to 1995. From 1995 to 1998, Seifert worked for MGM MediaGruppe München, where he rose to head of product management. From 1998 to 2000, Seifert was Director of Marketing in Central Europe for MTV Networks. From 2000 to 2005, Seifert was Member of the Board of KarstadtQuelle New Media AG; and CEO there from 2004.

Football official
On 1 July 2005, Seifert became the CEO of DFL German Football League and vice-president of the DFB. In the management of DFL, Seifert was, among other things, responsible for the strategic direction of the DFL. He became a member of the League Board on 7 August 2007. In 2009, Seifert was appointed Deputy Chairman of the Board of the Bundesliga Foundation, and a spokesman for the IPD Initiative Profisport Deutschland (Professional Sports Initiative Germany) in November 2009.

Seifert also served as the chairman of the World Leagues Forum.

References

1969 births
Living people
People from Rastatt
German football chairmen and investors
University of Duisburg-Essen alumni